Anthony (Tony) Cox (born 24 January 1954) is a Zimbabwean-born guitarist and composer based in Cape Town, South Africa. A master of the fingerpicking style of guitar playing, he has won the SAMA (South African Music Awards) for best instrumental album thrice. His music incorporates many different styles including classical, blues, rock and jazz, while keeping an African flavour.

Early life
Born in Zimbabwe, multiple award-winning South African acoustic guitarist, singer/songwriter, 
Tony Cox has become a veritable icon of the instrument in his own country and has been 
described as one of South Africa’s finest musical exports. For a number of years now he has 
undertaken regular forays into Europe and North America and has seen a loyal fan-base begin 
to develop in the UK, Germany and Canada.

When he was just nine years old Tony began, incredibly, learning and playing the Hawaiian 
guitar in what was then Rhodesia. This was brought about by one Archie Pereira arriving from 
Lisbon and for reasons unknown decided to settle in the backwater of Kwe-Kwe, a town 20 
miles away from Tony’s mining-town birthplace, Redcliff.

In his teens and after Archie disappeared back to Lisbon, Tony changed to a conventional guitar 
style and later, in order to ‘get the technique’, he studied the classical guitar. In 1969 the family 
left Rhodesia to settle in Cape Town, South Africa and it is here the young guitarist really 
started to absorb and assimilate the multi-textured rhythms and facets of the rich, indigenous 
music of his upbringing and surroundings.

He began to compose his own music early and immediately charged it with the African imagery 
that is very much a part of this unique guitar player's world perspective. Using all the finger�style techniques he had absorbed over the years from such greats as Leo Kottke and Bert 
Jansch and closer to home, Sipho Mchunu and Noise Khanyile both great exponents of Zulu 
Maskandi guitar style, Tony honed and developed a style all his own. With the rigorous precision
of classical technique juxtaposing the loose, laid-backed delivery of a master at work, Tony’s 
music tumbles out at you, hitting your tapping feet with its solid groove and taking your heart 
and mind on harmonic journeys that stretch away to African horizons.

Tony Cox on-stage is as warm and engaging with his audience as he is off-stage. Telling stories 
and anecdotes and using much wry humour, he draws a person in and you find yourself listening
really closely to a tune you may never have heard before and then being punched in the solar�plexus at the power and delivery of that tune. Besides being a solo performer Tony has 
collaborated and recorded with many other musicians to produce three SAMA award-winning 
albums and a string of nominations. China (UK/SA slang for friend) is just such an album. He recorded it in 2002 featuring many of 
the cream of SA musicians and is a fine example of Tony’s ability to work beyond the confines of
solo guitar playing. The album won the ‘best instrumental’ category at the 2003 SAMA awards. 
He went on to win the same award another two times for his albums, Matabele Ants in 2003, 
and Blue Anthem in 2008. His 2014 album Padkos, Tony's homage to great SA composers, 
was nominated for the 2015 SAMA awards. 2016 saw Tony return to his roots as a singer with 
the release of his album, Enormous Flowers, an album that is destined to become a South 
African classic.

Known throughout South Africa for being a dedicated teacher of the acoustic guitar, Tony runs 
his own online school of the acoustic guitar. Besides his face-to-face students Tony teaches 
online and has students as far afield as India, Sweden and the UK. When not teaching he 
travels the world performing. In 2020 the Cox family uprooted from South Africa and moved to the UK.

Discography
101 Ways to use an acoustic guitar (1983) with Steve Newman
Out of Line (1984) Out of Print Cassette
Planetarium Live (c. 1989) with Steve Newman - Out of Print Cassette
In to nation (1991) Out of Print LP
Alive at Le Plaza (1993) with Steve Newman - Out of Print Cassette
Cool friction (1996)
Looking for Zim (1998)
Matabele ants (2001), SA Award-Winner
The Aquarian Quartet - Live (2002)
China (2003)SA Award-Winner
About time (2002) with Steve Newman
Tony Cox - In Concert at the Grahamstown National Festival of the Arts (2005)
Blue Anthem featuring Benguela (2007)SA Award-Winner
Audient (2008)
Tony Cox & Steve Newman - Return of the Road Warriors (2010)
The Summer Comes My loves (2011)
Padkos (2014)
Enormous Flowers (2017)
The World Went Quiet (2021)

External links
Tony Cox Site 2019
TONY COX | Listen and Stream Free Music, Albums, New Releases, Photos, Videos
Tony Cox - YouTube

1954 births
Living people
South African guitarists
Male guitarists